Events in the year 2017 in Papua New Guinea.

Incumbents
Monarch: Elizabeth II 
Governor-General: 
 until 18 February: Michael Ogio (died 18 February)
 18 February-28 February: Theo Zurenuoc
 starting 28 February: Bob Dadae
Prime Minister: Peter O'Neill

Provincial Governors
Central: Kila Haoda
Chimbu: Noah Kool
East New Britain: Ereman Tobaining Jr. then Nakikus Konga
East Sepik: Michael Somare then Allan Bird
Enga: Peter Ipatas
Gulf: Havila Kavo then Chris Haiveta
Hela: Francis Potape then Philip Undialu
Jikawa: William Tongamp
Madang: Jim Kas then Peter Yama
Manus: Charlie Benjamin
Milne Bay: Titus Philemon then Sir John Luke Crittin, KBE
Morobe: Kelly Naru then Ginson Saonu
New Ireland: Julius Chan
Oro: Gary Juffa
Sandaun: Amkat Mai then Tony Wouwou
Southern Highlands: William Powl
West New Britain: Sasindran Muthuvel
Western: Ati Wobiro then Taboi Awe Yoto
Western Highlands: Paias Wingti

Events
22 January – an earthquake of 7.9 magnitude struck off Papua New Guinea.

Deaths

18 February – Michael Ogio, politician, Governor-General (b. 1942).

4 March – Roger Hau'ofa, radio broadcaster and presenter (b. 1943)

20 March – John Giheno, politician (b. 1949)

References

 
2010s in Papua New Guinea
Years of the 21st century in Papua New Guinea
Papua New Guinea
Papua New Guinea